Estonian Boules Federation (abbreviation EBF) is one of the sport governing bodies in Estonia which deals with boules.

EBF was established on 30 January 1993. It is a member of the Fédération Internationale de Boules (FIB) and Estonian Olympic Committee.

References

External links
 

Sports governing bodies in Estonia